Totavi is an unincorporated community in Santa Fe County, New Mexico, United States along New Mexico Highway 502. It is the location of a Tewa Market & Fuel, operated by San Ildefonso Pueblo, the only buildings in the community.

History
Totavi was founded  as a trailer park, with a post office eventually opening in 1948 and operating until 1953.

Geography

Located nearby is the Totavi Lentil, part of the Puye Formation.

References

Populated places established in 1945
Unincorporated communities in New Mexico
Unincorporated communities in Santa Fe County, New Mexico